Luitpold Popp (7 March 1893 – 30 August 1968) was a German football defender who played for 1. FC Nürnberg.

Popp joined Nürnberg in 1917, and went on to win four German football championships with the club. He also made five appearances for the Germany national team between 1920 and 1926.

Honours
 German football championship: 1920, 1921, 1925, 1927

References

External links
 

1893 births
1968 deaths
Footballers from Nuremberg
German footballers
Germany international footballers
Association football defenders
1. FC Nürnberg players